Christophe Deylaud (born 2 October 1964 in Toulouse) is a French former rugby union footballer and a current coach. He played as a fly-half and as a centre.

Deylaud first played at Portet-sur-Garonne, and from there moved to Blagnac SCR, where he stayed from 1985/86 to 1989/90. He played two seasons at RC Toulon, before joining Stade Toulousain. He went on to win four French Champion titles, for 1994, 1995, 1996 and 1997, and the Heineken Cup, in 1996. He also won twice the Challenge Yves-du-Manoir, in 1993 and 1995. Deylaud finished his career at SU Agen, and after retiring from playing went to become assistant coach for the same club. He is currently the head coach of Blagnac SCR.

Deylaud was capped 16 times for France, from 1992 to 1995, which included a memorable series win in New Zealand against the All Blacks in 1994.  He was also selected for the 1995 Rugby World Cup in South Africa. During his international career, he scored 1 try, 5 penalties, 11 conversions and 3 drop goals, 51 points in aggregate.

References

External links

1964 births
Living people
French rugby union players
French rugby union coaches
Rugby union fly-halves
Rugby union centres
France international rugby union players
Rugby union players from Toulouse
RC Toulonnais players
Stade Toulousain players
SU Agen Lot-et-Garonne players